Abbigeri  is a village in the southern state of Karnataka, India. It is located in the Ron taluk of Gadag district.

See also
 Gadag
 Districts of Karnataka

References

External links
 https://web.archive.org/web/20090409224557/http://gadag.nic.in/

Villages in Gadag district